Spinipogon spiniferus is a species of moth of the family Tortricidae. It is found in Brazil (Minas Gerais, Paraná, Santarem).

References

Moths described in 1967
Cochylini